Curt Lowens (17 November 1925 – 8 May 2017) was a German actor of the stage and in feature films and television, as well as a Holocaust survivor and a rescuer who saved about 150 Jewish children during the Holocaust.

Life and career
Born Curt Löwenstein in the East Prussian town of Allenstein (now Olsztyn, Poland), his father was a respected lawyer, and his mother was active with several local Jewish community organizations. His father's career declined due to loss of clients after the Nazis' takeover of Germany, so the family moved to Berlin hoping that the city's large Jewish community could provide more protection. Young Curt continued to receive an education and to prepare for his bar mitzvah under the guidance of Rabbi Manfred Swarsensky of the Fasanenstrasse Synagogue. After the violence of Kristallnacht (also known as the November Pogrom) in November 1938, the Nazis closed his school. In early 1939, Lowens received his bar mitzvah in a school auditorium with 34 other youths.

Lowens' older brother Heinz successfully emigrated to Britain a few months before the start of World War II. Curt and his parents planned to emigrate to the United States via the neutral Netherlands in early 1940. While waiting to depart from Rotterdam, however, the Germans invaded the Netherlands on the intended day of their departure. During the first two years of the German occupation, Curt's father worked at a desk job for the Jewish Council in Amsterdam, which initially saved the family from deportation to Auschwitz. Nonetheless, Curt and his mother were rounded up, unexpectedly, and deported to Westerbork in June 1943, but they were released through his father's connections.

The family subsequently went into hiding, each separately since individuals were more readily placed in homes of rescuers. Curt took on the false identity of "Ben Joosten". He managed to visit his mother when she, also under a false name, was treated at a hospital run by Catholic nuns; she died in January 1944. By war's end, some 150 Jewish children were rescued by this group alone. Curt Lowens also aided two downed American Army Air Corps flyers, for which he later received a commendation from General Dwight D. Eisenhower. After liberation, he joined the British Eighth Corps as an interpreter, aiding the British in their house arrest of the remaining Nazi leaders in Flensburg, Germany in mid-May 1945.

In 1947, Curt, his father, and step-mother immigrated to the United States. Under the name Curt Lowens, he trained to become an actor, studying at the Herbert Berghof Studio in New York. He appeared in over 100 films and TV shows since 1960. Lowens died on 8 May 2017 at the age of 91 in Beverly Hills.

Selected filmography

 1960 Two Women
 1961 Francis of Assisi as Friar (uncredited)
 1961 Werewolf in a Girls' Dormitory as Director Swift
 1961 Barabbas as Disciple (uncredited)
 1962 The Reluctant Saint 
 1962 The Four Days of Naples as Sakau (uncredited)
 1962 Imperial Venus 
 1963 Il processo di Verona as German Captain
 1966 Combat! (Episode: "Ask Me No Questions") as Captain Haus
 1966 Blue Light (Episode: "Invasion by the Stars") as Colonel Dietrich
 1966 Torn Curtain as VOPO Officer At Roadblock (uncredited)
 1967 Hogan's Heroes (Episode: "Hogan and the Lady Doctor") as Gestapo Captain
 1967 Tobruk as German Colonel
 1968 Counterpoint as Captain Klingerman
 1968 Garrison's Gorillas (TV Series) as Major Sturm / Colonel Krueger / Colonel Broiler
 1969 The Secret of Santa Vittoria as Colonel Scheer
 1971 The Mephisto Waltz as Agency Chief
 1973 Trader Horn as Schmidt
 1974 M*A*S*H (TV Series) as Luxembourg military Officer Colonel Blanche
 1975 The Hindenburg as Elevator Man Felber
 1976 The Swiss Conspiracy as Korsak
 1977 The Other Side of Midnight as Henri Correger
 1979 Missile X – Geheimauftrag Neutronenbombe as Russian Scientist
 1979 Battlestar Galactica (TV series) "Greetings from Earth" episodes 19/20
 1980 The Secret War of Jackie's Girls (TV Movie) as Dr. Kruger
 1982 Firefox as Dr. Schuller
 1982 The Entity as Dr. Wilkes
 1983 To Be or Not To Be as Airport Officer
 1983-1987 The A-Team (TV Series) as Soviet Embassy Official
 1985 Knight Rider as Dr. Von Boorman
 1988 Private War as Paul Devries
 1989 Night Children
 1991 Paid To Kill as Spinosa
 1992 A Midnight Clear as Older German Soldier
 1993 Mandroid as Drago
 1993 Necronomicon as Mr. Hawkins (part 2)
 1993 Invisible: The Chronicles of Benjamin Knight as Drago
 1994 Babylon 5 (TV Series) as Varn
 1995 Aurora: Operation Intercept as Dr. Zaborszin
 1997 The Emissary: A Biblical Epic as Judas
 1997 A River Made to Drown In as The Landlord
 2005 The Cutter as Colonel Speerman
 2006 Ray of Sunshine as The Count
 2007 Hellsing Ultimate as Van Hellsing (English version, voice)
 2008 Miracle at St. Anna as Dr. Everton Brooks
 2009 Angels & Demons as Cardinal Ebner
 2011 Supah Ninjas as Mechanov
 2012 She Wants Me as Grandpa Arnie

References

External links
 
 
 

1925 births
2017 deaths
American male film actors
American male stage actors
American male television actors
German emigrants to the United States
20th-century German Jews
Westerbork transit camp survivors
Jewish American male actors
People from East Prussia
People from Olsztyn
20th-century American male actors
21st-century American male actors
21st-century American Jews